The Many Sides of Gene Pitney is the debut album of Gene Pitney, released on the Musicor label in 1962. It was mostly a collection of previously released singles. Among them was "(I Wanna) Love My Life Away" which charted at #39 on the Billboard Hot 100 on March 4, 1961 and was on the charts for eight weeks. The song "Every Breath I Take" charted as high as #42 on September 16, 1961, and was on the charts for eight weeks. "Town Without Pity" rose as high as #13 on January 27, 1962 and was on the charts for 19 weeks. It also features two songs that Pitney had previously written for Ricky Nelson, "Hello Mary Lou" and "Today's Teardrops"; the latter also recorded by Roy Orbison.

Track listing 
"Town Without Pity" (Dimitri Tiomkin, Ned Washington) – 2:55
"(I Wanna) Love My Life Away" (Pitney) – 1:56
"I Laughed So Hard I Cried" (Aaron Schroeder, Ann Orlowski) – 2:19
"Dream For Sale" (Phil Spector, Terry Phillips) – 2:34
"Twenty Two Days" (Pitney) – 2:32
"Today's Teardrops" (Schroeder, Pitney) – 1:56
"Hello Mary Lou" (Pitney) – 1:56
"Take Me Tonight" (Schroeder, Roy Alfred, Wally Gold) – 2:37
"Harmony" (Pitney) – 1:58
"A Greater Love" (Schroeder, Pitney) – 2:05
"Every Breath I Take" (Gerry Goffin, Carole King) – 2:47
"Sure Fire Bet" (Pitney) – 1:48
"Chance to Belong" (Pitney) – 2:03

References

1962 debut albums
Gene Pitney albums
Musicor Records albums